Ava's Impossible Things is a 2016 American romance drama film written, produced and directed by Marina Rice Bader. It stars Chloe Farnworth, Susan Duerden, Abigail Titmuss, Lauryn Nicole Hamilton and Marc Hawes. The film had its premiere screening at the 2016 Outfest Los Angeles LGBT Film Festival on July 16, 2016, and was then made available on Vimeo as part of their 'Share the Screen' initiative.

Plot
Ava and her mother Faye both have a pernicious disease that will one day take their lives. They are also mutually joined together by an unconditional love for one another, a passion for the arts, and a belief that magic does exist. Ava moved back into her mother's house three years ago to care for her, and ever since then, she has witnessed the deterioration of her mother's health and all she can really do is try to keep her mother from becoming depressed and devitalized. But one day, Faye makes a shocking announcement that propels Ava into a tailspin. When rare guests start to arrive and unexpected events start to happen, Ava is unable to deal with reality. She cries herself to sleep in her mother's arms and escapes to a dream world filled with old friends and long forgotten desires.

Cast
 Chloe Farnworth as Ava
 Susan Duerden as Faye / Claire
 Abigail Titmuss as Anna / Freya
 Lauryn Nicole Hamilton as Jessa / Emma
 Marc Hawes as Sweet P
 Jesselynn Desmond as Leslie / Lumi
 Gabrielle Stone as Depression
 Alexandra Weaver as Acceptance
 Jean Nadine as Bargaining 
 Darcie Odom as Anger

Production notes
Vimeo acquired Marina Rice Bader’s film as part of their effort for a more gender-inclusive film program. Vimeo's 'Share the Screen' initiative is designed to try and close the immense gender gap in the entertainment industry by promoting films, workshops and interviews that provide a strong female voice. This is Rice Bader's fifth film by her production company Soul Kiss Films, which aims to make movies by women and for women. The movie premiered at the 2016 Outfest Los Angeles LGBT Film Festival, and the film was then made available on Vimeo On Demand the day after the festival

See also

 List of LGBT-related films directed by women

References

External links

Ava's Impossible Things at Rotten Tomatoes

2016 films
2016 LGBT-related films
2016 romantic drama films
American LGBT-related films
American romantic drama films
Lesbian-related films
LGBT-related romantic drama films
2010s English-language films
2010s American films